Śródborze may refer to the following places:
Śródborze, Ciechanów County in Masovian Voivodeship (east-central Poland)
Śródborze, Płońsk County in Masovian Voivodeship (east-central Poland)
Śródborze, Świętokrzyskie Voivodeship (south-central Poland)